Chennai–Thiruvananthapuram Superfast Express (Train number: 12695 /12696) is a daily superfast train connecting Chennai to Thiruvananthapuram.

Coach composition
The train consists of 22 coaches:

 1 AC 2 tier
 6 AC 3 tier
 10 Sleeper class
 1 Pantry car
 2 Unreserved/General
 2 Seating cum luggage rake

As with most train services in India, coach composition may be amended at the discretion of Indian Railways depending on demand.

Timings
MGR Chennai Central (15:25 PM) → Thiruvananthapuram Central (07:35 AM)

Thiruvananthapuram Central (17:20 PM) → MGR Chennai Central (10:00 AM)

The important halts on this route are :-

References

Express trains in India
Transport in Chennai
Rail transport in Tamil Nadu
Transport in Thiruvananthapuram
Rail transport in Kerala